Darius Sanajevas (born 14 February 1977 in Kaunas) is a former Lithuanian footballer.

Sanajevas has made six appearances for the Lithuania national football team.

Honours
Inkaras Kaunas
A Lyga runner-up: 1994–95, 1995–96
A Lyga bronze: 1996–97
Lithuanian Football Cup winner: 1995
Lithuanian Football Cup runner-up: 1996, 1997

Žalgiris Vilnius
A Lyga runner-up: 1999

FBK Kaunas
A Lyga champion: 2000, 2001, 2002, 2003, 2004, 2007
A Lyga runner-up: 2005
Lithuanian Football Cup winner: 2002, 2004, 2005, 2008

References

External links

1977 births
Sportspeople from Kaunas
Living people
Lithuanian footballers
Lithuania international footballers
Association football defenders
FBK Kaunas footballers
FK Inkaras Kaunas players
FC Spartak Vladikavkaz players
Russian Premier League players
Lithuanian expatriate footballers
Expatriate footballers in Russia
FK Žalgiris players
FK Šilutė players
FK Kareda Kaunas players